The 1981 European Tour was the 10th official season of golf tournaments known as the PGA European Tour and organised by the Professional Golfers' Association.

The season was made up of 22 tournaments counting for the Official Money List, and some non-counting tournaments later known as "Approved Special Events".

The Official Money List was won by West Germany's Bernhard Langer.

Changes for 1981
There were several changes from the previous season, with the addition of the Lawrence Batley International, and the loss of the Newcastle Brown "900" Open and the Merseyside International Open.

Rule changes
The local rule that had been introduced on the tour in 1976 which allowed spike marks to be repaired was rescinded, and a local rule that prohibited touching of the line of a putt with a club was introduced.

Schedule
The following table lists official events during the 1981 season.

Unofficial events
The following events were sanctioned by the European Tour, but did not carry official money, nor were wins official.

Official money list
The official money list was based on prize money won during the season, calculated in Pound sterling.

Awards

See also
List of golfers with most European Tour wins

Notes

References

External links
1981 season results on the PGA European Tour website
1981 Order of Merit on the PGA European Tour website

European Tour seasons
European Tour